Duchess Sophie Charlotte Augustine in Bavaria (23 February 1847 – 4 May 1897) was a granddaughter-in-law of King Louis Philippe of France, the favourite sister of Empress Elisabeth of Austria and fiancée of King Ludwig II of Bavaria.

Life
Sophie Charlotte was born at the Possenhofen Castle, the residence of her paternal family, the Dukes in Bavaria. She was a daughter of Duke Maximilian Joseph in Bavaria and Princess Ludovika of Bavaria. The ninth of ten children born to her parents, she was known as Sopherl within the family.

Marriage
Upon the 1861 marriage of her elder sister Duchess Mathilde Ludovika to the Neapolitan prince Louis of the Two Sicilies, her parents looked for a suitable husband for Sophie Charlotte. Sophie then was engaged to her cousin King Ludwig II of Bavaria, and their engagement was publicised on 22 January 1867, but after having repeatedly postponed the wedding date, Ludwig finally cancelled it in October as it seemed Sophie had fallen in love with the court photographer Edgar Hanfstaengl. 
Other proposed husbands included the renowned homosexual Archduke Ludwig Viktor of Austria, brother of both Franz Joseph I of Austria and Maximilian I of Mexico, as well as the future Luís I of Portugal. Another candidate was Duke Philipp of Württemberg, the first cousin of her eventual husband.

She refused all the candidates, and was sent to stay with her aunt Amalie Auguste, then the Queen of Saxony as wife of King John. It was in Saxony Sophie Charlotte met Prince Ferdinand of Orléans, Duke of Alençon, the son of Prince Louis, Duke of Nemours and grandson of the late King Louis Philippe. Soon after, on 28 September 1868, she married him at Possenhofen Castle, near Starnberg.

Duchess of Alençon
She had a good relationship with her husband as well as with her sister-in-law Princess Marguerite Adélaïde of Orléans, wife of Prince Władysław Czartoryski. Her mother-in-law, Princess Victoria of Saxe-Coburg and Gotha, cousin of Queen Victoria of the United Kingdom, had died in 1857. Sophie Charlotte did not have an overly good relationship with her father-in-law, the widowed Duke of Nemours.  

The year after their marriage, the ducal couple moved into Bushy House in the Teddington area of Southwest London, where Sophie Charlotte gave birth to her first child, Princess Louise of Orléans.

Later years and death
Sophie Charlotte wrote her last will and testament on 4 October 1896, seven months before her death: she died in a fire at the Bazar de la Charité in Paris on 4 May 1897, where she had been helping to raise funds for charity. She refused to be rescued, insisting that the girls, visitors and nuns working alongside her at the bazaar be saved first. A Dominican nun who had managed to escape from the fire explained that she saw the Duchess get down on her knees and start praying.

Identifying Sophie Charlotte's remains was not easy; her personal maid was unable to recognise the body, as it had been severely disfigured by the fire. The Duchess's dentist, M. Lavanport, was called in. After two hours examining various bodies, he identified Sophie Charlotte on the basis of her gold fillings. Thus she became one of the first people whose remains were identified by forensic dentistry.

Issue

 Louise Victoire Marie Amélie Sophie d'Orléans (19 July 1869 – 4 February 1952); married Prince Alfons of Bavaria and had issue. The family line ended in dynastical sense in 1990 in male line, with cognatic descendants still present.
 Philippe Emmanuel Maximilien Marie Eudes d'Orléans, Duke of Vendôme (18 January 1872 – 1 February 1931); married Princess Henriette of Belgium and had issue. The family line ended dynastically in 1970 in male line, with cognatic descendants still present.

Ancestry

References and notes

1847 births
1897 deaths
Nobility from Munich
Duchesses of Alençon
Princesses of France (Orléans)
House of Wittelsbach
Duchesses in Bavaria
Burials at the Chapelle royale de Dreux
Deaths from fire
Accidental deaths in France